Yenangyaung Township is a township of Magway District in the Magway Division of Myanmar. Yenangyaung is bordered on the south by Magway, on the east by Natmauk, on the north by Chauk, on the northeast by Kyaukpadaung and on the west by the Ayeyarwady River. The principal town is Yenangyaung.

Townships of Magway Region